
De Engel is a restaurant in Rotterdam, in the Netherlands. It is a fine dining restaurant that was awarded one Michelin star in 1997 and retained that rating until 2001. It held a Bib Gourmand at least in 2003.

GaultMillau awarded the restaurant 13.0 out of 20 points.

The head chef of De Engel is Lars Litz. During the Michelin period, it was Herman den Blijker. He still owns the restaurant.

The restaurant is housed in a Dutch national monument, a mansion with stucco cornice and stucco decorations, built in the third quarter of the 19th century.

See also
List of Michelin starred restaurants in the Netherlands

References 

Restaurants in Rotterdam
Michelin Guide starred restaurants in the Netherlands